Dahlonega (YTB-770) was a United States Navy .

Construction

The contract for Dahlonega was awarded 18 January 1963. She was laid down on 4 November 1963 at Mobile, Alabama, by Mobile Ship Repair and launched 23 March 1964.

Operational history
Dahlonega was placed in service in the 5th Naval District, at Norfolk, Virginia.  She served there until she was stricken from the Navy Directory 12 March 2001.  Ex-Dahlonega was sold by the Defense Reutilization and Marketing Service 16 July 2001 to McAllister Towing for $141,000 and renamed Jeffrey McAllister. In 2015 McAllister sold her to the Great Lakes Towing Company, who renamed her Ontario.

References

External links

Natick-class large harbor tugs
Ships built in Mobile, Alabama
1964 ships